is the debut studio album by Japanese musician Kahimi Karie. It was released on March 25, 1997 by Crue-L Records.

Background
Released after a string of six EPs, Larme de Crocodile draws from several musical genres, including jazz, French chanson and electronic music. Karie explained that with the album, she "wanted to make really, really melancholic music, to be alone".

Larme de Crocodile features five songs written by Scottish musician Momus, including two with music by accordionist Coba. Momus' own recording of one of these songs, "Lolitapop Dollhouse", appears on his album Ping Pong, released the same year. Larme de Crocodile also features collaborations with Yasuharu Konishi of Pizzicato Five, Aiha Higurashi of Seagull Screaming Kiss Her Kiss Her and French musician Philippe Katerine.

Track listing

Charts

References

External links
 

1997 debut albums
Kahimi Karie albums